An antipsychotic ester is an ester of an antipsychotic. They are used clinically as prodrugs to increase fat solubility and thereby prolong duration when antipsychotics are used as depot injectables.

List of clinically used antipsychotic esters

Typical antipsychotics
 Bromperidol decanoate
 Clopentixol decanoate
 Flupentixol decanoate
 Fluphenazine decanoate
 Fluphenazine enanthate
 Haloperidol decanoate
 Oxyprothepin decanoate
 Perphenazine decanoate
 Perphenazine enanthate
 Pipotiazine palmitate
 Pipotiazine undecylenate
 Zuclopentixol acetate
 Zuclopentixol decanoate

Atypical antipsychotics
 Aripiprazole lauroxil
 Paliperidone palmitate

Pharmacology

References